Kafr Zibad is a Palestinian village in the Tulkarm Governorate in the eastern West Bank, located 17 kilometers south of Tulkarm.

Name
The name of Kafr Zibad is thought to be originally from Zabad, its Semite name which means generosity. E. H. Palmer noted that the name meant the village of Zebed, and suggested to connect it with Zebedee, a Hebrew name.

History
Archeological findings from Kafr Zibad include potsherds from the Byzantine period and a relief of a six-armed menorah.

Ottoman era
Kafr Zibad was incorporated into the Ottoman Empire in 1517 with all of Palestine, and in 1596 it appeared under that name in the tax registers as being in the Nahiya of Bani Sa'b of the Liwa of Nablus. It had a population of 50 households, all Muslims. The villagers paid a fixed tax rate of 33.3% on various agricultural products, such as wheat, barley, summer crops, olive trees, goats and/or beehives, in addition to "occasional revenues" and a press for olive oil or grape syrup; a total of 10,280 akçe.

In 1838, Robinson noted Kefr Zibad as a village in Beni Sa'ab district, west of Nablus.

In 1882, the PEF's Survey of Western Palestine noted at Kafr Zibad: "A village of moderate size on a small plateau, overhanging the valley on the north of it. It is of stone. A steep ascent, with a cistern on the north, on the south a fig-garden, and beyond this a few olives, where the tents of the Survey party were pitched. Near them was a rock-cut tomb. The water supply is from cisterns."

British Mandate era
In the 1922 census of Palestine conducted  by the British Mandate authorities, Kufr Zaibad had a population of 260 Muslims, increasing in the 1931 census to 469 Muslims, in 96 houses.

Of this,  were plantations and irrigable land,  were used for cereals, while  were built-up (urban) land.

Jordanian era
In the wake of the 1948 Arab–Israeli War, and after the 1949 Armistice Agreements, Kafr Zibad came under Jordanian rule.

In 1961, the population of Kafr Zibad was 643.

Post 1967
After the Six-Day War in 1967, Kafr Zibad came under Israeli occupation.

19% of the population of Kafr Zibad were refugees in 1991. The healthcare and education facilities for the surrounding villages are based in Kafr Zibad, Kafr Zibad secondary school being one of the best schools in the region. There is a historical mosque dated to the times of Caliph Omar Ibn al-Khattab, and there are a police center and sport club. The facilities are designated as MOH level 2.

Kafr Zibad had a population of approximately 1,306 inhabitants in mid-year 2006.

After Israel built the Israeli West Bank barrier,  of irrigated land owned by Kafr Zibad villagers was isolated behind the barrier. Access to this land is dependent on Israeli cumbersome permitting process.

Footnotes

Bibliography

External links
Welcome To Kafr Zibad
Survey of Western Palestine, Map 11:  IAA, Wikimedia commons

Villages in the West Bank
Municipalities of the State of Palestine
Ancient Samaritan settlements